Narach or Naroch may refer to:

Narach (lake), Belarus
Narach (town), Belarus
Narach (village), Belarus
Narach (river), Belarus

See also 
 Narachanski National Park, Belarus
 Narak (disambiguation)